Annie Elisabeth Law (1842–12 January 1889) was a British-American conchologist, who discovered 11 species and one genus of mollusks, but did not publish formal descriptions of them. She was also a dispatch rider for the Confederate army during the American Civil War and was tried in Knoxville as a confederate informer.

Personal life 

Annie Law was born in 1842 in Carlisle, England, the first of three children of John Law. The family migrated to the United States in around 1850, settling in Maryville, Blount County, Tennessee.

After her parents had died, Law spent time in California, including four years in Hollister, San Benito County. While residing in Hollister Law visited Blount County and collected ethnological artefacts from a native American burial mound. These she donated to the Smithsonian Institution. She later resided at Watsonville, Santa Cruz County, where she died on 12 January 1889.

Conchology 

Law collected specimens in the mountainous regions of North Carolina and Tennessee. She corresponded with James Lewis, who published a paper describing her finds in the Holston River, and other papers formally describing the species she discovered. Species she discovered include the following, two of which were named in her honor:

 Appalachina chilhoweensis, previously known as Helix chilhoweensis (Lewis, 1874)
 Helix lawii now known as Praticolella lawae (Lewis, 1874)
 Pleurobema oviforme (Conrad, 1834), previously known as Unio lawi Lea, 1871
 Zonites acerra (Lewis, 1874)
 Zonites cerinoidea var. cuspidata (Lewis, 1875)
Zonites lawii

References

Further reading
 M. B. Williamson, 1894. Miss Annie Law, a Tennessee conchologist. The New Cycle (Federation of Women’s Clubs, New York) 7(8): 256-259

American women biologists
Conchologists
People from Carlisle, Cumbria
People from Hollister, California
People from Maryville, Tennessee
People from Watsonville, California
1842 births
1889 deaths